Purana nebulilinea is a cicada species distributed in peninsular Malaysia, Sumatra, Borneo and nearby smaller islands. Its song consists of a long sequence (around 1 minute) of high pitched sounds with a characteristic frequency modulation pattern which can be repeated many times without interruption.

References

External links
 
 

Leptopsaltriini
Hemiptera of Asia
Insects of Borneo
Insects of Malaysia
Insects described in 1868
Taxa named by Francis Walker (entomologist)